The 2008 Bombardier Learjet 550 was the seventh round of the 2008 IndyCar Series season and took place on June 7, 2008 at the  Texas Motor Speedway, in Fort Worth, Texas. In the first half, three single-car incidents involving Mario Domínguez, Justin Wilson, and Oriol Servià slowed the race. The lead changed hands between Hélio Castroneves, Bruno Junqueira, and Scott Dixon for the first 100 laps. Two sequences of green flag pit stops occurred under a long stretch of green flag conditions. A caution for debris came out on lap 165, sending the leaders to the pits once more. Vítor Meira stayed out to take over the lead.

With 21 laps to go, Meira was forced to pit for fuel, giving up the lead to Marco Andretti. Moments later, Enrique Bernoldi crashed in turn four. Andretti led the field back to green on lap 219. With six laps to go, Dixon slipped by Andretti to take the lead. On the next lap, down the backstretch, third place Ryan Hunter-Reay dove below Andretti heading into turn three. Hunter-Reay pinched his left wheels onto the apron, lost control, and touched wheels with Andretti. Both cars spun and crashed hard into the wall. The race finished under caution with Dixon the winner, and Castroneves slipping by the accident to finish second.

Result

References 
IndyCar Series (Archived 2009-05-21)

Bombardier Learjet 550
Bombardier Learjet 550
Bombardier Learjet 550
Firestone 600